The 1879 Princeton Tigers football team represented the College of New Jersey, then more commonly known as Princeton College, in the 1879 college football season. The team finished with a 4–0–1 record and was retroactively named national champion by the Billingsley Report and National Championship Foundation and as co-national champion by Parke H. Davis.  This season was Princeton's ninth national championship, and one of 11 in a 13-year period between 1869 and 1881. The team's captain was Bland Ballard.

Schedule

References

Princeton
Princeton Tigers football seasons
College football national champions
College football undefeated seasons
Princeton Tigers football